Fourmile Lake or Four Mile Lake may refer to:

Four Mile Lake (Ontario), Canada
Fourmile Lake, Michigan, an unincorporated community
Fourmile Lake (Minnesota), US
Fourmile Lake (Oregon), US
Fourmile Lake (South Dakota), US